Ecuador competed in the 2008 Summer Olympics, held in Beijing, People's Republic of China from August 8 to August 24, 2008. As of July 1, 2008, 25 Ecuadorians had qualified to compete in nine sports.

Medalists

Athletics

Men
Track & road events

Field events

Women
Track & road events

Boxing

Ecuador qualified three boxers for the Olympic boxing tournament. All three qualified at the first American qualifying tournament.

Cycling

BMX

Judo

Shooting 

Women

Swimming

Men

Women

Taekwondo

Tennis

Weightlifting

See also
Ecuador at the 2007 Pan American Games

References
sports-reference

Nations at the 2008 Summer Olympics
2008
Summer Olympics